Darren Boughey (born 30 November 1970) is an English former footballer who played in the Football League for Exeter City, Stoke City and Wigan Athletic.

Career
Boughey was born in Newcastle-under-Lyme and began his career with local side Stoke City. He broke into the first team towards the end of the 1989–90 season with Stoke already condemned to relegation to the Third Division. He played in seven league matches that season but in 1990–91 he found himself back in the reserves only playing in the League Cup and Football League Trophy. In January 1991, he joined Wigan Athletic on loan where he played twice for the "Latics" and scored twice before returning to Stoke. He then ended the season with Exeter City playing in eight matches for Terry Cooper's side scoring once. He was then released by Stoke and entered non-league football with Stafford Rangers.

Career statistics
Source:

A.  The "Other" column constitutes appearances and goals in the Football League Trophy.

References

English footballers
Stoke City F.C. players
Exeter City F.C. players
Wigan Athletic F.C. players
Stafford Rangers F.C. players
English Football League players
1970 births
Sportspeople from Newcastle-under-Lyme
Living people
Macclesfield Town F.C. players
Association football forwards
National League (English football) players